Spinning into Butter is a play by the American playwright Rebecca Gilman. It was premiered at the Goodman Theatre in Chicago in 1999 and was later produced at the Lincoln Center and the Royal Court Theatre Upstairs. It was named one of the best plays of 1999 by Time and eventually became the third-most-produced play of the 2000-01 season in America.

Plot synopsis

The play takes place at fictional Belmont College, a mostly-white liberal arts school in Belmont, Vermont. The curtain opens on Sarah Daniels, Dean of Students, talking with sophomore Patrick Tyler Chibas. Wanting Patrick Tyler to receive a scholarship for minority students, Sarah convinces him to mark his ethnicity as Puerto Rican, even though he considers himself to be "Nuyorican", which is not a university-recognized ethnicity at Belmont. 

The next scene shows Professor Ross Collins, Head of Humanities Burton Strauss and Dean Catherine Kenny waiting to have a meeting with Sarah. When Sarah comes in, she tells them that freshman Simon Brick, one of the few African-American students, has started receiving hateful, racist notes. The all-white administration scrambles to contain the problem and reassure parents that everything is under control. Strauss proposes scheduling a meeting to discuss racism. Ross and Kenny agree that this is a good idea. However, Sarah wants to talk to Simon before holding a campus-wide meeting. She suspects that he would be embarrassed if other students knew about the notes.
   
Two weeks later, senior Greg Sullivan comes to Sarah's office. He has been inspired by the race forum and asks her about forming a student group called "Students for Tolerance". Sarah thinks this is a great idea. 

Ross informs Sarah that there will be a second meeting to discuss race. She found the first meeting unproductive and suggests that the next one have some effect beyond a lot of white people discussing how bad racism is. Burton comes in and informs them that Greg Sullivan has asked him to sponsor the Students for Tolerance organization.
   
Simon receives another racist note beginning, "Little Black Sambo". Sarah decides to talk to Simon, but before she can go, Patrick Tyler comes to see her and informs her that when he received the scholarship, his financial aid was taken away. She reassures him that she will get it back. Patrick Tyler is still upset and tells her that the race forum was insulting and patronizing. Sarah convinces him to bring this up at the next forum.

The next day, Sarah meets with Patrick to discuss his editorial in the school newspaper. She reads from Patrick Tyler's article discussing Burton's patronizing outburst at the second race forum; when Patrick Tyler and other students tried to speak out about their feelings, Burton yelled at them. The article describes racism being widespread throughout the administration. It tells of Patrick Tyler being offered a scholarship before the college even knew his ethnicity, which he understands to be tokenism that insults the entire student body. He informs her that he, the Black Student Union, and almost everyone he knows is boycotting the next race forum and that he is going to another school in the spring because he hates Belmont. Sarah is sorry and says she was not paying attention to who he was.

The president of the school receives a letter from Patrick Tyler and is upset about the racial discord. So Catherine asks Sarah to write a ten-point plan of how to eliminate racism at Belmont. Sarah stays late at school to work on the plan. Ross comes by and Sarah, in a controversial scene, reveals to him her not-so-latent racism. She tells Ross that before working at Belmont, she worked at Lancaster, a mostly black college. She calls blacks lazy, stupid, scary, loud, belligerent, abusive and rude. She says of Lancaster, "There were plenty of nice kids, but they weren't the ones you noticed." Sarah also reveals that when choosing a seat on the bus, she looks first for a seat by a white person, then a yellow person, and lastly a black person. Ross says, "Most people are just racists. They don't know they're racists." 

Sarah learns that Simon wrote the notes to himself. While she is away visiting him, Kenny goes into Sarah's office and discovers racist remarks written on Sarah's notebook. Sarah tells Ross about her visit with Simon. She explains that the boy said he saw himself writing the notes but felt like someone else was doing it. Sarah says she told him, "Stop hating yourself."
 
Sarah, Ross, Kenny, and Burton meet in Sarah's office to discuss Simon. Kenny thinks that he wrote the notes for attention and Sarah says that Simon did not know what he wanted. Burton remembers that Simon referred to himself as "Little Black Sambo" in one of the notes. Burton tells Sambo's story, which the play's title comes from. Burton uses this story to explain the behavior of Simon. Burton thinks that Simon is a "little con artist" who got the administration all whirled up just like Sambo got the tigers. 
   
Kenny asks Sarah to explain the discriminatory remarks written in her notebook. Sarah refuses to and puts in her resignation. She dealt with Simon differently from the administration - she was much more sympathetic to his circumstances - but it was her exposed racism that led to her resignation.

Greg Sullivan meets with Sarah as she is packing. He says that Students for Tolerance invited the Black Student Union to a meeting to discuss racism and that the students really opened up about it. They wondered why Simon wrote the notes, but could not conclude why he did it. Because Simon lied to the administration, he is expelled from school. Mr. Meyers drives him home and Sarah calls him. She tells Simon not to be too hard on himself.

Origin
Rebecca Gilman was a student for a short time in 1983 at Middlebury College in Middlebury, Vermont, before transferring to Birmingham-Southern. The origin of Spinning into Butter is an incident like the one in the play that happened at Middlebury in fall 1983. An African-American freshman named John Grace living in the freshman dormitory Allen reported that he had found racist notes on his door marker board and a rock thrown through his window. There were few black students at Middlebury and they were a fairly insular group, but almost nobody on campus felt Middlebury was a racist institution. The student body, the faculty and the administration were horrified. Students rallied around Grace and guarded his dorm room 24 hours a day. Even with the guard, Grace found another racist note in his room. On September 30, 1983, an investigation discovered that Grace had written the note. He admitted it and promptly left campus. Middlebury College President Olin Robison held an All-College meeting that was very well attended immediately after Grace left campus informing the college of these events.

Controversy
The play's treatment of racism has sparked some controversy. Several productions include a forum at the end for audience members to discuss the issues raised. The well-known novelist Ishmael Reed criticized the play, calling it racist and clumsy, but other critics defend the play, arguing that it exposes rather than perpetrates racism. 

The play's treatment of political and social issues in an academic context has prompted comparisons with David Mamet's play Oleanna (1992).

Productions
The world premiere was presented by the Goodman Theatre in Chicago on May 16, 1999.
Artistic director: Robert Falls
Executive director: Roche Schulfer
Director: Les Waters
Assistant director: Jerry Curran
Set design: Linda Buchanan
Costumes: Birgit Rattenborg Wise
Lighting: Robert Christen
Sound design and music: Rob Milburn and Larry Schanker
Cast: Mary Beth Fisher (Sarah), Andrew Navarro (Patrick), Jim Leaming (Ross), Robert Breuler (Dean Strauss), Mary Ann Thebus (Dean Kenney), Matt DeCaro (Mr. Meyers) and Bruch Reed (Greg).

The play opened Off-Broadway at the Lincoln Center Mitzi E. Newhouse Theater on July 26, 2000, in association with Lincoln Center Festival 2000, and closed on September 16, 2000.
Director: Daniel Sullivan
Set design: John Lee Beatty
Costumes: Jess Goldstein
Lighting: Brian MacDevitt
Original music and sound: Dan Moses Schreier
Cast: Hope Davis (Sarah), Jai Rodriguez (Patrick), Daniel Jenkins (Ross), Henry Strozier (Dean Strauss), Brenda Wehle (Dean Kenney), Matt DeCaro (Mr. Meyers) and Steven Pasquale (Greg).

The British premiere of the play was at the Royal Court Theatre Upstairs in January 2001, directed by Dominic Cooke.

Film adaptation

A film version of the play was released in 2007. It was directed by Mark Brokaw and stars Sarah Jessica Parker, Miranda Richardson and Beau Bridges. Parts of the film were shot in and around New York City on Governors Island, at Brooklyn College and Drew University in Madison, New Jersey.

References

External links
Internet Off-Broadway Database listing
 
"Rebecca Gilman, Birmingham-Southern College"

American plays adapted into films
Plays by Rebecca Gilman
1999 plays
Plays about race and ethnicity